Khumkar (also Romanized as Khūmkār) is a village in Dehdasht-e Sharqi Rural District, in the Central District of Kohgiluyeh County, Kohgiluyeh and Boyer-Ahmad Province, Iran. At the 2006 census, its population was 11, in 4 families.

References 

Populated places in Kohgiluyeh County